Thomas L Schwarz is an American neuroscientist and molecular biology researcher at Children's Hospital, Boston, and a professor of Neurology and Neurobiology in the Department of Neurobiology at Harvard Medical School.

Thomas Schwarz is best known for discovering and characterizing the Drosophila protein Milton. This protein has been shown to be crucial to mitochondrial localization to the nerve terminal.

Education
Thomas Schwarz graduated from Harvard College, where he was heavily involved with the college's WHRB radio, before earning a PhD from Harvard Medical School. His doctoral advisor was scientist Edward Kravitz.

References

Living people
American neuroscientists
Harvard Medical School faculty
Harvard College alumni
Harvard Medical School alumni
Year of birth missing (living people)
Scientists from New York City
American molecular biologists